The 1983–84 CHL season was the 21st and last season of the Central Hockey League, a North American minor professional league. Five teams participated in the regular season, and the Tulsa Oilers won the league title. Games against the U.S. and Canadian Olympic Teams (not listed) counted in the regular season standings.

Regular season

Playoffs

External links
 Statistics on hockeydb.com

CPHL
Central Professional Hockey League seasons